First Lake is located in the Town of Webb in Herkimer County, New York, by the hamlet of Old Forge. First Lake is part of the Fulton Chain of Lakes. First Lake is the source of the Middle Branch Moose River.

References

Lakes of New York (state)
Lakes of Herkimer County, New York